The Vinyl Cafe Family Pack (2011) is a 4-CD album by Stuart McLean released by Vinyl Cafe Productions.

This is a collection of some of the most requested "Dave and Morley Stories", featuring the family at the centre of the popular CBC Radio show, The Vinyl Cafe.

Track listing
Disc 1 - Dave
 "Dave goes to the Dentist" - 20:26
 "Odd Jobs" - 18:14
 "Dave and the Bike" - 15:18
 "Dave Cooks the Turkey" - 26:02

Disc 2 - Morley
 "Holland" - 18:22
 "The Hairdresser" - 20:15
 "Labour Pains" - 18:25
 "Morley"s Book Club" - 19:56

Disc 3 - The Kids
 "The Waterslide" - 22:35
 "Tree Planting" - 17:52
 "Sam the Athlete" - 20:19
 "Dream Bunnies" - 19:09

Disc 4 - The Pets
 "Cat in the Car" - 18:12
 "Arthur the Dog" - 14:33
 "Dave and the Duck" - 20:00
 "Toilet Training the Cat" - 20:41

See also
Stuart McLean
The Vinyl Cafe
List of Dave and Morley stories

References

External links
 Vinyl Cafe with Stuart McLean - The Official Website

Stuart McLean albums
2011 live albums